The 1971 All-Atlantic Coast Conference football team consists of American football players chosen by various selectors for their All-Atlantic Coast Conference ("ACC") teams for the 1971 NCAA University Division football season. Selectors in 1971 included the Associated Press (AP).

All-Atlantic Coast Conference selections

Offensive selections

Ends
 John McMakin, Clemson (AP)
 Don Bungori, Maryland (AP)

Offensive tackles
 Ed Newman, Duke (AP)
 Jerry Sain, North Carolina (AP)

Offensive guards
 Ron Rusmak, North Carolina (AP)
 Bill Bobbora, Wake Forest (AP)

Centers
 Bob Thornton, North Carolina (AP)

Backs
 Larry Hopkins, Wake Forest (AP)
 Larry Russell, Wake Forest (AP)
 Lewis Jolley, North Carolina (AP)
 Paul Miller, North Carolina (AP)

Defensive selections

Defensive ends
 Bill Brafford, North Carolina (AP)
 Wayne Baker, Clemson (AP)

Defensive tackles
 Andy Selfridge, Virginia (AP)
 Bud Grissom, North Carolina (AP)

Linebackers
 John Bunting, North Carolina (AP)
 Ed Stetz, Wake Forest (AP)
 Larry Hefner, Clemson (AP)

Defensive backs
 Ernie Jackson, Duke (AP)
 Rick Searl, Duke (AP)
 Steve Bowden, Wake Forest (AP)
 Bill Hanenburg, Duke (AP)

Special teams

Kickers
 Ken Craven, North Carolina (AP)

Key
AP = Associated Press

See also
1971 College Football All-America Team

References

All-Atlantic Coast Conference football team
All-Atlantic Coast Conference football teams